Cathleen Garlick is an Australian former cricketer who played as a right-handed batter and occasional wicket-keeper. She appeared in two One Day Internationals for International XI, both at the 1973 World Cup. She played domestic cricket for Victoria.

References

External links
 
 

Living people
Date of birth missing (living people)
Year of birth missing (living people)
Place of birth missing (living people)
Australian women cricketers
International XI women One Day International cricketers
Victoria women cricketers
Wicket-keepers